Edward S. Anthoine (c. 1882 – October 29, 1942) was an American politician and lawyer from Maine. Anthoine, a Republican from Portland, served one term (1925–26) in the Maine Senate representing Cumberland County. In December 1927, Governor Owen Brewster appointed him to reporter of decisions of the Maine Supreme Judicial Court.

Personal life
Anthoine graduated from Bowdoin College (Class of 1902). His wife, Sara P. Anthoine (18871965), was a noted activist for women's suffrage. They had one child, Robert. Anthoine died following a brief illness in Togus, Maine, on October 29, 1942, at the age of 60.

References

1880s births
1942 deaths
Year of birth missing
Politicians from Portland, Maine
Lawyers from Portland, Maine
Bowdoin College alumni
Maine lawyers
Republican Party Maine state senators